Jorge Glusberg (23 September 1932 – 2 February 2012) was an Argentine author, publisher, curator, professor, and conceptual artist.

Early life and education 
Glusberg was born in Buenos Aires, Argentina.

When he was 12 years old Glusberg organized a "geology museum" on balcony of his house. In the space he exhibited rocks and other found objects from the Pampas for fellow neighborhood kids.

Career 
In 1968, Glusberg, along with Víctor Grippo, Jacques Bedel, Luis Fernando Benedit and others, founded the Centro de Estudios de Arte y Comunicación (CEAC) which was renamed Centro de Arte y Comunicación (CAyC) in the following year. Glusberg acted as Director of Centro de Arte y Comunicación (CAyC) from its inception until his death in early 2012.

In 1985 Glusberg founded the Buenos Aires International Biennial of Architecture.
In 1994 Glusberg was appointed Director of the Museo Nacional de Bellas Artes MNBA in Buenos Aires, a title which he held until 2003. Glusberg is recognized for creating the Photography Department at MNBA in 1995 though the appointment of Sara Facio as Curator of Photography.

Glusberg was co-director of Comité Internacional de Críticos de Arquitectura CICA. In 2002 he was leader of the Buenos Aires Biennale.

Glusberg participated in the international architecture symposium "Mensch und Raum" (Man and Space) at the Vienna University of Technology (Technische Universität Wien) in 1984, which received much international attention.  Other participants included Justus Dahinden, Pierre Vago, Bruno Zevi, Dennis Sharp, Frei Otto, Paolo Soleri and Ionel Schein. He wrote and edited several books about architecture, design and art in Latin America. He was a professor at New York University, Ball State University, National University of San Antonio Abad in Cuzco and University of Veracruz.

From 1978 to 1986, and from 1989 to 1992, Glusberg was president of the International Committee of Architectural Critics, Argentine chapter.

Honours and awards 
 1981: Biennale (Sofia, Bulgaria), Gold Medal
 International Union of Architects UIA, Jean Tschumi-Prize for Criticis
 1981: Knight Commander of Peru
 1987: Chevalier of the Ordre des Palmes Académiques

Selected exhibitions 
 1969: Arte y cibernética,  Galería Bonino de (Buenos Aires, Argentina)
 1972: Arte e ideología en CAyC al aire libre (Buenos Aires, Argentina)
 1974: Art Systems in Latin America, ICA (Londres, Reino Unido)
 1977: Identification of Artist - a book, Escola de Artes Visuais do Parque Lage (EAV/Parque Lage, Rio de Janeiro, Brazil)
 1977: Bienal Internacional de São Paulo, Fundação Bienal (São Paulo, Brazil)
 1979: Bienal Internacional de São Paulo, Fundação Bienal (São Paulo, Brazil)
 1999: Bienal de Artes Visuais do Mercosul (Porto Alegre, Brazil)
 1985: Bienal Internacional de São Paulo, Fundação Bienal (São Paulo, Brazil)
 2001: Bienal de Artes Visuais do Mercosul, Museu de Arte do Rio Grande do Sul Ado Malagoli (Porto Alegre, Brazil)

Selected works and publications 
 
 
 
  – Galena del Retiro (Madrid)
 
  – Checklist of an exhibition held at the Americas Society Art Gallery February 23-April 16, 1989

References

Further reading 
 Jorge Glusberg
 Biography Jorge Glusberg

External links 
 
 
 Jorge Glusberg at Museum of Fine Arts, Houston

1932 births
2012 deaths
Architects from Buenos Aires
Argentine curators
Argentine art curators
Argentine male writers
Architecture writers
Architectural theoreticians
New York University faculty
Ball State University faculty
Chevaliers of the Ordre des Palmes Académiques
Writers from Buenos Aires